In proof theory, an area of mathematical logic, proof compression is the problem of algorithmically compressing formal proofs. The developed algorithms can be used to improve the proofs generated by automated theorem proving tools such as SAT solvers, SMT-solvers, first-order theorem provers and proof assistants.

Problem Representation
In propositional logic a resolution proof of a clause  from a set of clauses C is a directed acyclic graph (DAG): the input nodes are axiom inferences (without premises) whose conclusions are elements of C, the resolvent nodes are resolution inferences, and the proof has a node with conclusion .

A node with no children is a root.

A simple example
Let's take a resolution proof for the clause  from the set of clauses

Here we can see:
 The node  has a pivot , 
 left resolved literal 
 right resolved literal 
  conclusion is the clause 
 The DAG would be

  is a root of the proof

In some works it can be found an algebraic representation of a resolution inference. When the pivot is uniquely defined or irrelevant, we omit it and write simply . In this way, the set of clauses can be seen as an algebra with a commutative operator; and terms in the corresponding term algebra denote resolution proofs in a notation style that is more compact and more convenient for describing resolution proofs than the usual graph notation.

In our last example the notation of the DAG would be  or simply 

We can identify

Compression algorithms
Algorithms for compression of sequent calculus proofs include Cut-introduction and Cut-elimination.

Algorithms for compression of propositional resolution proofs include 
RecycleUnits,
RecyclePivots,
RecyclePivotsWithIntersection,
LowerUnits,
LowerUnivalents,
Split,
Reduce&Reconstruct, and Subsumption.

Notes

Proof theory